Osmodes adon, the Adon white-spots, is a butterfly in the family Hesperiidae. It is found in Guinea, Sierra Leone, Ivory Coast, Ghana, Nigeria, Cameroon, the Democratic Republic of the Congo and north-western Tanzania. The habitat consists of forests.

References

Butterflies described in 1890
Erionotini
Butterflies of Africa